Runaway Train is the debut album from the Christian country group Crabb Revival. The album was released on May 30, 2008.

Track listing

All songs written by Adam Crabb, except where noted.
 "Runaway Train" (Crabb, Smith) - 5:15
 "The Journey" - 4:56
 "Rescue Me" - 3:18
 "The Power of One" (Hengber, Post, Still) - 3:40
 "Best Friends" (Crabb, Scweinsberg, Smith) - 2:58
 "Both Sides of the River" - 3:12
 "Smilin' Down on Me" - 3:00
 "You Amaze Me" - 3:52
 "Carry On" (Smith) - 3:15
 "Only a Man" (Lang) - 4:02
 "Ornament of Grace" (Crabb, Crabb) - 3:13
 [Untitled] - 1:53

Awards

Runaway Train was nominated for a Dove Award for Country Album of the Year at the 40th GMA Dove Awards.

References

External links 
 Crabb Revival Official Site
 Runaway Train at Amazon.com

2008 debut albums